Kamila Kubas (born 13 May 1983) is a Polish paracanoeist. She was a bronze medalist at the 2016 Summer Paralympics in paracanoe.

References

1983 births
Living people
People from Zielona Góra
Paracanoeists of Poland
Polish female canoeists
Paracanoeists at the 2016 Summer Paralympics
Medalists at the 2016 Summer Paralympics
Paralympic medalists in paracanoe
Paralympic bronze medalists for Poland